André Wogenscky (1916 - 2004) was a French Modernist architect — and member of the Académie des beaux-arts.

20th-century French architects
Modernist architects
1916 births
2004 deaths
People from Remiremont
Members of the Académie des beaux-arts
École des Beaux-Arts alumni